See Lists of Bible stories.

New Testament stories are the pericopes or stories from the New Testament of Christianity.

The Gospels and the Life of Jesus
For a list of all events in the life of Jesus, see Gospel harmony
For a list of parables told by Jesus, see Parables of Jesus
For a list of miracles attributed to Jesus, see Miracles of Jesus

The Acts of the Apostles
From the Acts of the Apostles
Ascension of Christ
Matthias replaced Judas
 The Day of Pentecost
Ananias and Sapphira
Seven Greeks appointed
The Stoning of Stephen
Preaching of Philip the Evangelist
Simon the Sorcerer
Paul's Conversion on the Road to Damascus
Peter's vision of a sheet with animals
Conversion of Cornelius
James, son of Zebedee executed
Liberation of Saint Peter
Death of Herod Agrippa I [44 AD]
Paul and Barnabas' first missionary journey
The Council of Jerusalem
Paul's Second missionary journey
Paul's Third missionary journey
Paul before Felix
Paul before Festus
Paul before Agrippa II
Paul's Journey to Rome

Epistle to the Galatians
From the Epistle to the Galatians
Conversion of Paul the Apostle
a meeting, possibly the Council of Jerusalem
Incident at Antioch

Revelation
For a list of events in the Book of Revelation, see Events of Revelation

See also
 Chronology of Jesus
List of Hebrew Bible events
New Testament

New Testament stories
New Testament stories